Calotis cuneifolia, the purple burr-daisy, is a species of daisy found in many parts of eastern and central Australia. A small herbaceous plant to 60 centimetres tall. Blue or purple flowers form at any time of year, but mostly seen in spring. The type specimen was collected by Allan Cunningham on the banks of the Lachlan River in 1817. The specific epithet "cuneifolia" refers to the wedged shape leaves.

References 

Astereae
Plants described in 1820
Flora of New South Wales
Flora of Victoria (Australia)
Flora of Queensland
Flora of South Australia
Flora of the Northern Territory